This is a list of vegetarian and vegan restaurants. Vegetarian cuisine refers to food that meets vegetarian standards by not including meat and animal tissue products. For lacto-ovo vegetarianism (the most common type of vegetarianism in the Western world), eggs and dairy products such as milk and cheese are permitted. For lacto vegetarianism, the earliest known type of vegetarianism (recorded in India), dairy products are permitted but eggs are not. The strictest forms of vegetarianism are veganism, raw veganism, and fruitarianism, which exclude all animal products, including dairy products as well as eggs and even some refined sugars if filtered and whitened with bone char.

Notable vegetarian restaurants

 Adyar Ananda Bhavan, India, Singapore, Malaysia, Australia, Kenya and United States
 Annalakshmi, Malaysia, Australia, Singapore and India
 Aviv, Portland, Oregon, US
 Bloodroot, Bridgeport, Connecticut, US
 Café Gratitude, five locations, California, US
 Café Paradiso, Cork, Ireland
 Çiğköftem, Turkish fast food chain, 130 restaurants as of 2020
 Claire's Corner Copia, New Haven, Connecticut, US
 Clover Food Lab, Cambridge, Massachusetts, US
 Cranks, London, England
 Dirt Candy, New York City, New York, US
 Food for Thought, London, England
 Govinda's Restaurant, various locations all over the world
 Goli Vada Pav, India
 Green Elephant Vegetarian Bistro, Portland, Maine, US, and Portsmouth, New Hampshire, US
 Greens Restaurant, San Francisco, California, US
 Hard Times Cafe, Minneapolis, Minnesota, US
 Hiltl Restaurant, Zurich, Switzerland
 The Hollow Reed, Portland, Maine, US
 InSpiral Lounge, Camden Lock, England 
 Kesar Da Dhaba, Amritsar
 Lentil as Anything, Melbourne and Sydney, Australia
 Murugan Idli Shop, India and Singapore, a chain of vegetarian restaurants headquartered in Madurai
 The New Riverside Cafe, Minneapolis, Minnesota, US
 Namma Veedu Vasanta Bhavan, Chennai, Trichy and Villupuram, India
 New Woodlands Hotel, Chennai
 Penny Cafeteria, New York City, New York, US
 The Pitman Vegetarian Hotel, Birmingham, England
 Saravana Bhavan, a Chennai based restaurant with 110 branches
 The Sound Lounge, a vegan restaurant within a grassroots music venue (complete with vinyl record shop) in Sutton, south London.
 Sree Annapoorna Sree Gowrishankar, Coimbatore, India
 Taïm, New York City, New York, US
 Veggie Galaxy, Cambridge, Massachusetts, US
 Veggie Victory, Nigeria
 Vidyarthi Bhavan, South Bengaluru Bangalore, India

Notable vegan restaurants

 Baby Blue Pizza, Portland, Oregon
 Ben & Esther's Vegan Jewish Deli
 Blossoming Lotus, Portland, Oregon, US 
 Candle Cafe, three locations, New York City, New York, US
 Crossroads Kitchen, Los Angeles, California, US
 Cinnaholic, 14 locations, US
 Dirty Lettuce, Portland, Oregon
 Elizabeth's Gone Raw, Washington, D.C., US
 G-Zen, Branford, Connecticut, US
 Life on Mars, Seattle
 Little Pine (restaurant), Los Angeles, California, US
Lord of the Fries 19 locations in Australia and 4 in New Zealand.
 Loving Hut, 138 locations, Asia, Australia, Europe, North America, and South America
 Mama Đút, Portland, Oregon
 Mis Tacones, Portland, Oregon
 Mondragon Bookstore & Coffeehouse, Winnipeg, Manitoba, Canada (closed January 2014)
 Native Foods Cafe, 14 locations, California, Colorado, Illinois, and Oregon, US
 ONA, the first vegan restaurant in France to win a Michelin star
 Pink Peacock, Govanhill, Glasgow, Scotland
 Plant, Asheville, North Carolina, US
 Plum Bistro, Seattle
 Purezza, British pizza and Italian food chain from Brighton, UK
 Red and Black Cafe, Portland, Oregon, US (closed March 2015)
 Two Dollar Radio Headquarters, Columbus, Ohio, US
 Vedge, Philadelphia, Pennsylvania, US
 VeganBurg, Singapore and San Francisco, California, US
 Veggie Grill, 29 locations, California, Oregon, and Washington, US

See also

 Health food restaurant
 Lists of restaurants
 List of vegetarian and vegan companies
 List of fictional vegetarian characters

References

Lists of restaurants